Svetlana Valentinovna Kryuchkova (born 21 February 1985) is a Russian volleyball player. At the 2012 Summer Olympics, she competed for the Russia women's national volleyball team in the women's event.

Awards

Club
 2012–13 CEV Women's Challenge Cup –   Champion, with Dinamo Krasnodar

References

1985 births
Living people
Russian women's volleyball players
Sportspeople from Lipetsk
Olympic volleyball players of Russia
Volleyball players at the 2012 Summer Olympics